Yo-Yo Rodriguez (also known as Slingshot) is a superhero appearing in American comic books published by Marvel Comics. Created by writer Brian Michael Bendis and artist Alex Maleev, the character first appeared in The Mighty Avengers #13 (July 2008). She has a form of super speed which, when used, returns her to the place she started. She was a member of Nick Fury's Secret Warriors team. She is the daughter of supervillain Johnny Horton.

Yo-Yo Rodriguez was portrayed by Natalia Cordova-Buckley in the Marvel Cinematic Universe TV series Agents of S.H.I.E.L.D.. In this version she was reimagined as an Inhuman.

Publication history
Yo-Yo Rodriguez first appeared in The Mighty Avengers #13 (July 2008) and was created by writer Brian Michael Bendis and artist Alex Maleev. Born in Puerto Rico, she is the daughter of the supervillain John "Johnny" Horton. Through her father's mutated DNA, she gained superhuman speed and the ability to snap back to the exact same spot she started running. Following the Secret Invasion event, taking on the name Slingshot, she was one of the members of Nick Fury's black-ops team called the Secret Warriors, which was written by Bendis and Jonathan Hickman. During this run, both her arms were cut off by Hydra member Gorgon, and were later replaced with two prosthetic arms.

Fictional character biography
Yo-Yo Rodriguez was the Puerto-Rican daughter of the Griffin. She gained superhuman speed due to her father's mutated DNA.

She was recruited by Nick Fury to join his anti-Skrull task force during the "Secret Invasion" storyline. This team becomes known as the Secret Warriors.

Both of her arms were severed by the Gorgon and she was temporarily unable to remain active with the team. Both arms are later replaced with prosthetics. With her new arms, she returns to active duty.

Slingshot is believed to have been killed in a confrontation with the Wrecking Crew.

Powers and abilities
Slingshot can run at superhuman speed and bounces back to the point where she began. She has been trained by Nick Fury in espionage, hand-to-hand combat, and firearms. Her primary weapon is a bo staff.

Reception

Accolades 
 In 2018, CBR.com ranked Slingshot 21st in their "25 Fastest Characters In The Marvel Universe" list.
 In 2020, Scary Mommy included Slingshot in their "Looking For A Role Model? These 195+ Marvel Female Characters Are Truly Heroic" list.
 In 2022, CBR.com ranked Slingshot 5th in their "10 Fastest Marvel Sidekicks" list and 18th in their "Marvel: The 20 Fastest Speedsters" list.

In other media

Television 

 Elena "Yo-Yo" Rodriguez appears in Agents of S.H.I.E.L.D., portrayed by Natalia Cordova-Buckley. This version is a "street-wise Colombian Inhuman with the ability to move at super-speed for the duration of one heartbeat before returning to the point from which she started. Introduced in the third season episode "Bouncing Back", she comes into contact with S.H.I.E.L.D. when they investigate her for stealing weapons from the National Police of Colombia's corrupt members after they kill her cousin Francisco. She grows close to Mack, who nicknames her "Yo-Yo" due to her powers, and eventually agrees to join S.H.I.E.L.D.'s Secret Warriors to help them fight Hive's forces. After signing the Sokovia Accords, Rodriguez returned to her life with occasional monitoring by S.H.I.E.L.D. before returning to the team after encountering the Watchdogs and pursuing a relationship with Mack in the fourth season. In the fifth season, Hydra agent Ruby Hale slices off Rodriguez's forearms,  but the latter survives and eventually receives robotic prosthetic arms developed by her colleague Leo Fitz, though they initially clash with her powers due to the messages being sent between her brain and arms not moving fast enough until Fitz fixes the problem. Upon learning Ruby had infused herself with gravitonium, Rodriguez becomes involved in the field to kill her before she can destroy the world with her unstable powers. In the seventh season, Jemma Simmons develops new bionic prosthetics made to resemble her original arms so Rodriguez can work undercover amidst their team's efforts to stop the Chronicoms before they can erase S.H.I.E.L.D. from history. Eventually, Rodriguez realizes that she has been holding herself back and unlocks her powers' full potential, allowing her to move at speed without snapping back to where she started. As of the series finale, Rodriguez has become one of S.H.I.E.L.D.'s top agents.
 Cordova-Buckley reprises her role in Agents of S.H.I.E.L.D.: Slingshot.

References

External links
 
 Yo-Yo Rodriguez at Marvel Wiki

Characters created by Alex Maleev
Characters created by Brian Michael Bendis
Comics characters introduced in 2008
Fictional Colombian people
Latin American superheroes
Marvel Comics characters who can move at superhuman speeds
Marvel Comics female superheroes
Marvel Comics television characters
Puerto Rican superheroes
S.H.I.E.L.D. agents